Preston or Preston Village is a suburb of Brighton, in the unparished area of Brighton, in the Brighton and Hove district, in the ceremonial county of East Sussex, England. It is to the north of the centre. Originally a village in its own right, it was eventually absorbed into Brighton with the development of the farmland owned by the local Stanford family, officially becoming a parish of the town in 1928. Stanford-owned land to the south of Preston Manor was given to the town and now makes up Preston Park, one of the largest parks in the now conjoined city of Brighton and Hove. The park hosts some of the city's major public events such as Brighton Pride.

Preston, the suburb of Melbourne, Victoria, Australia was named after the village in 1856.

History 
The name "Preston" means 'Priests' farm/settlement'. Preston was recorded in the Domesday Book as Prestetone. In 1921 the parish had a population of 31,161. On 1 April 1928 the parish was abolished and merged with Brighton.

See also
 Preston Park railway station
 St Mary's Church, Preston Park

Gallery

References

External links
 Preston on My Brighton and Hove

Areas of Brighton and Hove
Conservation areas in England
Former civil parishes in East Sussex
Brighton